Usino Bundi District is a district in the south of Madang Province in Papua New Guinea. It is one of the six administrative districts that make up the province.

References
 Madang Provincial Economic Profile

Districts of Papua New Guinea